The Most Wanted Tour was the debut headlining tour by American country musician Hunter Hayes. The tour was in support of Hayes' debut studio album titled Hunter Hayes.

Setlist
Light Me Up
Can't Say Love
Faith to Fall Back On
Somebody's Heartbreak
Rainy Season
Don't Let Our Love Start Slippin' Away (Vince Gill cover)
All You Ever
Cry With You / Shower the People (James Taylor cover)
What You Gonna Do
If You Told Me To
Everybody's Got Somebody But Me
Wanted
Keep Your Head Up (Andy Grammer cover)
Where We Left Off
Play (Rascal Flatts cover)
A Thing About You
Love Makes Me
Encore:
Love Makes Me
Somebody's Heartbreak
Storm Warning
Encore 2:
Just the Way You Are (Bruno Mars cover)

Tour dates

References

2011 concert tours
Hunter Hayes concert tours